Elvira: Mistress of the Dark is a 1988 American comedy horror film directed by James Signorelli. It stars Cassandra Peterson as eccentric horror hostess Elvira, a character previously established in the television program Elvira's Movie Macabre. The character's feature film debut, the film's plot centers on Elvira inheriting a house that is nestled in the heart of an overtly prudish community. The film's screenplay was written by Peterson, John Paragon, and Sam Egan.

Elvira: Mistress of the Dark received generally mixed reviews from critics. Peterson was nominated for both a Saturn Award for Best Actress and a Razzie Award for Worst Actress in 1989 for her performance in the film. She went on to reprise her role as Elvira in the 2001 film Elvira's Haunted Hills.

Plot
Buxom Los Angeles TV horror hostess Elvira, Mistress of the Dark, quits her job after the station's new owner sexually harasses her. She plans to open an act in Las Vegas, but needs $50,000 for the project. Upon learning she is a beneficiary of her deceased great-aunt Morgana, she travels to Fallwell, Massachusetts, to claim the inheritance, which includes a mansion, a recipe book and Morgana's pet poodle, Algonquin.

In Fallwell, Elvira's worldly attitude and revealing clothes set the conservative town council against her, but theater operator Bob Redding befriends her. The town's teenagers quickly accept her, to the chagrin of their parents, who consider her a bad influence. Bowling alley owner Patty is interested in Bob, and at Elvira's late-night horror film festival at Bob's theater she succeeds in humiliating Elvira. Elvira struggles to sell the house so she can depart for Las Vegas. Meanwhile, she is unaware that her harsh but seemingly-harmless uncle, Vincent Talbot, is actually a warlock who is obsessed with obtaining Morgana's spellbook. He offers Elvira $50.00 for the book. When he visits Morgana's house to buy it from Elvira, Algonquin hides it much to Vincent's dismay. He plans to kill Elvira and conquer the world, and has been fueling the townspeople's hostility.

Elvira tries to impress Bob with a home-cooked dinner, but mistakenly uses the spellbook as a cookbook and summons a creature that attacks them. Elvira learns that the cookbook was actually her mother Divana's spellbook, and that Morgana hid her as an infant to protect her from Vincent. When Elvira tries to unleash the creature against the Morality Club at their picnic for revenge, she prepares the brew incorrectly and it instead has an aphrodisiac effect; the adults begin behaving sexually, dancing and removing their clothing while Elvira observes nearby. She is accosted by Vincent, who again offers to buy the book for a much higher price of $500 which is this time refused by Elvira. When Patty confronts Elvira, the resulting fistfight ends up humiliating Patty by revealing that her bra is stuffed.

Vincent leads the townspeople in arresting Elvira for witchcraft, which is still illegal in the state. They decide to burn her at the stake. The teenagers try to free her from jail but fail and accidentally lock themselves into a different cell. Bob tries to recover the spellbook from the mansion, but is tied up by Vincent and his goons, who take the book. Algonquin transforms into a rat and frees Bob by gnawing through his bonds. Elvira is tied to a stake and the fire is lit, but she uses Morgana's ring to summon a rainstorm which quenches the flames; she then escapes with Bob. At the mansion, Elvira and Vincent engage in a magical battle that sets fire to the house. Elvira banishes Vincent to the underworld, while the house and all of the magical artifacts are destroyed.

The next day, Elvira prepares to leave town. The townspeople apologize for their behavior, and they ask Elvira to stay. She kisses Bob but, as she is homeless, she insists that she must leave. As his sole living relative, Elvira has inherited Vincent's estate, which allows her to open her show in Las Vegas, where she performs a lavishly-produced musical number.

Cast

Production

Pre-production
As her Elvira character skyrocketed to fame, Cassandra Peterson announced plans to spin her off into a feature film. NBC casting director Joel Thurm pitched the idea of a sitcom to network president Brandon Tartikoff, who became enthusiastic about the notion. However, Peterson had her heart set on bringing the character to the big screen, and there were concerns that she would never get the opportunity if she made the leap to prime time. Tartikoff later finalized a deal for NBC to produce a film, which would possibly be followed up with sequels, and eventually a TV series but he ended up leaving the network before a show materialized.

Peterson and frequent writing collaborator John Paragon met in the comedy troupe The Groundlings, and he worked his way up from recurring guest-star to writer on her Movie Macabre series. Sam Egan was brought into the fold because he was an experienced TV writer and had impressed Peterson with his script for The Fall Guy episode "October the 31st," which he had written explicitly for her. Tartikoff pushed for a storyline similar to Harper Valley PTA, and after the first draft was turned in, the writers were forced to add a group of teenagers, which resulted in reducing screen time for all of the other characters.

After appearing in a small part in Pee-Wee's Big Adventure, Peterson thought Tim Burton was the perfect choice to direct her film, but he got tied up with the production of Beetlejuice. Tartikoff tapped James Signorelli to direct. Although Signorelli only had one feature film to his credit, he had been prolifically churning out commercial parodies on Saturday Night Live since 1977.

Peterson was dealt a crushing blow with the 1986 AIDS-related death of Robert Redding, to whom she dedicated the film and named the character of Bob after. She and Redding had collaborated to create Elvira's look, and he painted the portrait which is used for Morgana Talbot. Accustomed to Redding styling her wigs, Peterson became perpetually unhappy with their appearance and later admitted that she was too harsh with the film's wig stylist.

The name of the fictional town of Fallwell, Massachusetts, where Elvira moves to in the film, has been noted for its resemblance to the surname of Jerry Fallwell, an American televangelist, conservative activist, and co-founder of the Moral Majority.

Casting
Many roles were played by Cassandra Peterson's associates from The Groundlings, including Edie McClurg (Chastity Pariah), Tress MacNeille (Anchorwoman), Joey Arias (Hitchhiker), Lynne Marie Stewart (Bartender), Deryl Carroll (Charlie), and co-writer John Paragon (Gas Station Attendant). Paul Reubens was also supposed to appear in a bit part, but this became unfeasible when Big Top Pee-wee went into concurrent production, so his cameo came in the form of a Pee-Wee Herman doll that is visible in Elvira's dressing room. Additionally, Eve Smith was a regular on Movie Macabre (playing Elvira's Auntie Virus), Peterson's parents were prominently featured as extras during her character's arrival in Fallwell, her assistant was the game show girl, and the motorcycle cop was played by ex-boyfriend Bill Cable, whom she had posed with for a 1974 Playgirl magazine spread. The following year, she was featured in another nude photo spread depicting intergalactic lovers floating through outer space, in the March 1975 issue of Playgirl with adult film star icon turned Hollywood Fixer, Paul Barresi.

The role of Elvira's "Uncle Vinnie" was written specifically for Vincent Price, and although they had become friends, he passed due to the racy material. Producer Joel Thurm zeroed in on William Morgan Sheppard for the part, but he became frustrated as Sheppard changed his readings from one audition to the next. On the day Sheppard had to audition for network executives, Thurm told him to be "more evil," and Sheppard took this note to heart, which won him the role.

Bob Redding was written as the male "equivalent of a blonde bimbo," but they had difficulty finding anyone who had both the looks and the acting skills to pull it off. All eyes were on Daniel Greene when he came in to audition, and he was convinced that he got the part due to a genuinely stunned, naive reaction that he had to one of Peterson's off-color remarks.

Kurt Fuller, who was cast as Fallwell's realtor, Mr. Glotter, was actually supporting himself working in real estate. He was so convinced that he had bombed his audition that he told his agent that he quit showbiz. Later that day, his agent called to say that he had been offered the role.

The role of Randy was narrowed down to two actors: Kris Kamm and Brad Pitt. Kamm won the part because Peterson felt Pitt was so handsome that Elvira would ignore Bob and fawn over him.

Filming
The film was shot over a span of eight weeks, between January and March 1988. The first scenes were shot at a bowling alley in Montrose, California, and Peterson worried about beginning the production with her character's big monologue, but much bigger stresses were soon to follow.

One of the most problematic issues was Peterson's costar, Binnie, a temperamental poodle that did not seem to like anyone except his trainer. Peterson would not allow them to use a permanent dye on the dog's fur, instead, they used a vegetable dye mixture that had to be touched up and reapplied daily. The dog had trouble hitting its mark, it did not perform properly and actually attacked Kurt Fuller's ankle, leaving the actor with long-lasting scars, plus entire scenes had to be dubbed to mute the trainer's commands.

Music
The original musical score was composed by James B. Campbell. Although there were several well-known songs in the film, licensing the original recordings was cost-prohibitive, so they were covered by stock singers. The goofy ditty "Chicken Fried Steak", which is faintly heard at the gas station, was an original composition written and performed by the founder of The Groundlings.

There was no soundtrack album and the majority of songs have never been issued, but "Here I Am" and two different versions of Lori Chako's "Once Bitten, Twice Shy" eventually surfaced on the digital compilation Elvira's Gravest Hits.

Reception
On the review aggregator website Rotten Tomatoes, which categorizes reviews only as positive or negative, 56% of 25 reviews are positive. On Metacritic, the film has a score of 43 out of 100 based on five critics, indicating "mixed or average reviews".  Caryn James in The New York Times rated the film 2/5 in 1988 saying that "there are only a couple of fresh and funny moments."

Writing for The Washington Post in 1999, Richard Harrington said the film "is stupid fun, a distaff, gothic version of Pee-wee's Playhouse. (...) [Elvira is] fun, a Transylvania Valley Girl grown up into the Queen of the Bs, but after 96 minutes you may start thinking more fondly about those '50s and '60s camp classics she's usually interspersed with."

Anthony Arrigo said in Dread Central in 2020 that "Elvira managed to make a seemingly oxymoronic character into a household name, built off her bountiful looks, quick wit, and indefatigable charisma." Daniel Barnes said in 2020 that "this one-note vehicle throws ambiguity and subtlety out the window in favor of a barrage of unfunny boob jokes." In Nashville Scene in 2021, Jason Shawhan said it's "campy, witty and always eager to push the bawdy limits of a PG-13 rating."

The film was not a commercial success; Peterson has stated that the distribution company for the film went out of business literally the day before release, causing the number of theaters showing the film to drop from over 2,500 to roughly 500, which resulted in the low box office.

Awards and nominations

The film received a Razzie Award nomination for Cassandra Peterson as Worst Actress in 1989, losing to Liza Minnelli for both Arthur 2: On the Rocks and Rent-a-Cop. "I even lost the worst actress, now that's sad!" Peterson quipped.

Nominations

Legacy

1990s–2000s: Proposed sequel, and Elvira's Haunted Hills 
Peterson quickly sold a script for a sequel, but it got tied up in red tape when Carolco Pictures went bankrupt. She followed through with plans to star in a sitcom, but 1993's The Elvira Show did not secure a spot on the TV schedule. Soon after, she announced the forthcoming Elvira Vs. the Vampire Women, but a contract dispute with Roger Corman prevented the film from being produced.

The script for Elvira's Haunted Hills was written in the late 1990s, but after spending three years trying to get Hollywood to produce the project, she and then-husband Mark Pierson decided to finance it themselves. The shoot in Romania was grueling, and they had difficulty securing distribution. In the same vein as Young Frankenstein, Haunted Hills spoofs the 1960s Roger Corman/Edgar Allan Poe films. Other than the Elvira character, there's no direct connection between the films, although it is sometimes referred to as a prequel since it is set more than a century earlier.

2010s–present: Netflix and Shudder 
Prior to Mistress of the Dark, there were already plans to feature Elvira in an animated series, but this has yet to materialize. In 2019, Peterson pitched the idea to Netflix and Shudder, which both passed. Around the same time, the character made her inaugural Scooby-Doo appearance in Return to Zombie Island. Elvira returned the following year with an increased role in Happy Halloween, Scooby-Doo!, in which she spends the bulk of in a flat-top variation of the Macabremobile and dispatches another monster with a stiletto to the forehead.

Peterson's Scooby experience was so positive that, after years of trying to get a third film produced, she announced in 2020 that the next Elvira film will likely be an animated feature. Although no specifics have been released, a detailed story treatment has been completed.

In October 2021, Elvira's 40th birthday special was announced on the YouTube channel for Shudder streaming, with the video "Burn Witch Burn". Throughout October, for Halloween, Elvira featured horror movies catalog on Netflix's YouTube channel, titled Netflix & Chills Meet Dr. Elvira.

References

External links

 
 
 
 
 

1988 films
1988 comedy films
1988 independent films
1988 horror films
1980s comedy horror films
1980s English-language films
American comedy horror films
American independent films
Elvira, Mistress of the Dark
Films about inheritances
Films about witchcraft
Films based on television series
Films directed by James Signorelli
Films set in country houses
Films set in Massachusetts
Films shot in Los Angeles
NBC Productions films
New World Pictures films
Self-reflexive films
American supernatural horror films
American drama television films
1980s American films